Hutch BMX was founded in 1979 by bicycle store owner Richard Hutchins in Pasadena, Maryland. Hutch BMX grew from a bicycle shop to a mail order business, and then to a BMX bicycle manufacturer. The company introduced their first model (Hutch Pro Racer) in 1981. The company is now named Hutch Hi-Performance inc.

History

Hutch BMX mail order business
Hutch BMX started out as a bicycle shop. Shop owner Richard Hutchins noticed many young BMX enthusiasts wanted bike parts which were only available on the West Coast. Eventually there were so many mail order customers that Hutchins closed the bike shop and became a mail order company full time. Hutchins then found a manufacturer to make BMX bicycle frames and forks, and he put his brand name "Hutch" on them. He then hired and sponsored the best riders he could find: Tim Judge, Rich Farside and Toby Henderson.

Hutch BMX manufacturer
By 1981 Hutch BMX decided to manufacture their own frames and forks. They relocated to an industrial park and hired welders to manufacture the frames and forks. The company was soon producing their own frame, fork and handlebars. The company's first completed bike was called the Hutch Pro Racer, and it was completed in 1981. It featured all chrome parts with some black parts. At over $400US some Hutch BMX bikes were the most expensive on the market.

By 1985 company began producing other frames like the Hollywood and Judge. The latter named for their Hutch team member Tim Judge, and former named for Mike "Hollywood" Miranda.

The company continues to operate in 2021 as Hutch Hi-Performance BMX.

See also
List of BMX bicycle manufacturers

References

Cycle manufacturers of the United States
American companies established in 1979
Companies based in Maryland
BMX
1979 establishments in Maryland